Abazai is a town and union council in Charsadda District of Khyber Pakhtunkhwa province of Pakistan. It is part of Tangi Tehsil and is located at 34°19'7''N 71°35'35''E at an altitude of 320 metres (1053 feet), lying to the northwest of the district capital Charsadda and 24 miles north of the provincial capital Peshawar on the left bank of the Swat river, a mile from the river's exit from the hills.

History
During British rule, it was a fort and village of Charsadda Tehsil, then part of Peshawar District.

The Imperial Gazetteer of India, compiled in 1908, describes the village and fort as follows:

Agriculture
The soil of Abazai is rich and fertile. It is known for its palatable fruits throughout the province. Mangoes from Abazai are sold in fruit mandi in high demand due to their luscious taste. In winters, Orange and kinnow trees could be seen along the road side. Similarly, in winters, jaggery, a by-product of sugar cane, is also produced in a decades old process of jaggery making in "Garaii" (a small confectionery consisting of a crusher and a large cooking pan)

References

Union councils of Charsadda District
Populated places in Charsadda District, Pakistan